Michelle Jacqueline Vieth Paetau (born November 19, 1979) is a Mexican-American television personality, actress, and model best known for her starring roles in Mexican telenovelas between the late 1990s and early 2000s.

Biography 
Michelle's mother and father met in Marshalltown, Iowa. United States. Her mother's family lived in Acapulco, Guerrero, Mexico at that time. Her father and his side of the family are from Marshalltown. For that reason from a young age Michelle was flying back and forth through both countries. At the age of 15 while in Acapulco, she was invited as an extra in the telenovelas  "El Premio Mayor" produced by Emilio Larrosa, "Acapulco, Cuerpo y Alma"  produced by Jose Alberto Castro and its English version produced by Carlos Sotomayor. But It was VP of Televisa and Producer Valentín Pimstein's last discovery for the company after discovering figures like Veronica Castro and Thalia. Pimstein saw something unique in Michelle so he took her to Mexico City and his team of specialists, who then decided that Michelle was going to be enrolled at the Centro de Educación Artistica (CEA) to study acting and modeling.  Almost a year later, Pedro Damián, who was part of Valentin's team, called her and offered her to be Mi Pequeña Traviesa, marking her debut in television as an actress.

In 2004, she was on Big Brother Celebrity VIP2 Mexico, and exited the fourth week of the show, finishing in 11th place.

Personal life

Vieth was married to Hector Soberon from 2001 to 2004, and the marriage was later annulled. She was engaged but never married  to Leandro Ampudia from 2004 to 2010, with whom she had a son, Leandro (born 2005), and a daughter, Michelle (born 2007). Since 2011, she's been in a long-term relationship with Christian Aparicio, and they have a son, Christian Aparicio, Jr. (born 2014), and a daughter, Selika (born 2016).

More than a decade ago, a private video of Vieth surfaced on the internet, a situation that she still considers heartbreaking and difficult to overcome. Vieth supports a citizen initiative that seeks the approval of the Vengeance Pornography Law, to prevent harassment through the network and the circulation of unauthorized sexual content of which she herself was a victim. After living it in her own flesh, Vieth contacted women's rights defender Matan Uziel from Real Women Real Stories, who helped her to tell her story.

Filmography

Awards and nominations

Other awards
Recognition by Career from Government of Acapulco in 2006
Recognition for Lifetime Achievement from Programa Mueveteb in 2006
Recognition by the Ministry of Tourism Acapulco and the Trust for Tourism Promotion of Acapulco in 2009

References

External links
 
 Michelle Vieth on Instagram
 Michelle Vieth at the Telenovela Database
 Michelle Vieth at Televisa's esmas.com site 
 Michelle Vieth at Univision. 

1979 births
Living people
Mexican child actresses
Mexican telenovela actresses
Mexican television actresses
Mexican stage actresses
Mexican voice actresses
Mexican female models
Mexican television presenters
American child actresses
American telenovela actresses
American television actresses
American stage actresses
American voice actresses
American female models
American television hosts
Actresses from Iowa
20th-century Mexican actresses
21st-century Mexican actresses
20th-century American actresses
21st-century American actresses
Mexican people of American descent
American people of Mexican descent
Naturalized citizens of Mexico
American emigrants to Mexico
People from Marshalltown, Iowa
People from Acapulco
Actresses from Guerrero
Mexican women television presenters
American women television presenters